Powszechny Zakład Ubezpieczeń Spółka Akcyjna (Polish pronunciation: , PZU) is a publicly traded insurance company, a component of the WIG20 and Poland's biggest and oldest insurance company. PZU is headquartered in Warsaw and also one of the largest financial institutions in Poland. It is also one of the top insurance companies in Central and Eastern Europe. 

PZU Group offers the selection of nearly 200 insurance products on the Polish market. The activity of PZU group encompasses the comprehensive insurance-financial service. The Group entities provide services in the area of non-life insurance, personal and life insurance, investment funds and open pension fund.

History

Foundation 
The company's origin dates back to 1803 when the first insurance company in Poland was established. In the years 1927-1952 the company operated under the name Powszechny Zakład Ubezpieczeń Wzajemnych and between 1952-1990 it was known as Państwowy Zakład Ubezpieczeń (State Insurance Company) as it was officially given a monopoly by the state and effectively became the largest insurance company in the country.

In 1991 PZU was turned into a joint stock company controlled by the State Treasury as a consequence of the political transformation after 1989.

In December 1991, the PZU Życie joint stock company was founded by polski Bank Rozwoju and Bank Handlowy in Warsaw. The PZU transferred its portfolio of life insurance contracts for PZU Życie.

In 1998, in relation with the reform of the pension insurance system in Poland, PZU Życie formed PTE PZU, a joint stock company, which operates the OFE PZU (Open Pension Fund).

On November 5, 1999, a share purchase agreement was concluded under which Eureko and BIG Bank Gdański SA acquired 20% and 10% respectively of the share capital of PZU. A dispute arose in connection with the implementation of the agreement, which was settled amicably in October 2009. A settlement and sale agreement were concluded between the parties.

Over the years 
In 2002, the PZU Group started its activities on the Lithuanian insurance market by acquiring shares in UAB DK “Lindra” (PZU Lietuva). With the acquisition in OAO “Skide West” (PZU Ukraina) in 2005, it began operations on the Ukrainian market again.

In the first half of 2008 PZU Group received 11,882.5 million Polish zloty in insurance premiums. This is an increase of 50.6% over the same period in 2007.

PZU was first quoted on the Warsaw Stock Exchange in May 2010.

In March 2014, it was revealed that PZU and Vienna Insurance Group were in the race to acquire rival Lietuvos Draudimas for around $147 million. In 2015 PZU acquired the direct insurer LINK4 in Poland and launched the PZU Zdrowie brand. In 2015, the transaction to acquire a 25.19% stake in the share capital of Alior Bank SA was completed. The next step was the transaction carried out by Alior Bank to acquire a separate part of Bank BPH, including the core business.

Today the PZU SA Group holds 31.94% of shares of the Alior Bank. In December 2016, PZU together with Polish Development Fund acquired Bank Pekao, Poland's second largest bank previously owned by UniCredit, by buying a 32.8 per cent stake in the bank for the amount of PLN 10.6 billion (EUR 2.6 billion).

Endorsement 
In February 2021, PZU Group became the official partner of Polish tennis player Iga Świątek.

Corporate affairs

Organizational structure 
The PZU Group currently comprises a total of 88 companies, some of which include:

Powszechny Zakład Ubezpieczeń na Życie SA 
Powszechne Towarzystwo Emerytalne PZU SA 
Towarzystwo Funduszy Inwestycyjnych PZU SA 
PZU Pomoc SA 
PZU Centrum Operacji SA 
PZU Tower Sp. z o.o. 
PZU Asset Management Sp. z o.o. 
Międzyzakładowe Pracownicze Towarzystwo Emerytalne PZU S.A. 
PZU Lietuva (Lithuania)
PZU Ukraine
Apdrošināšanas Akciju Sabiedrība Balta	(Latvia)
 PZU Finance AB (Sweden)
LLC SOS Services (Ukraine)
Ogrodowa – Inwestycje Sp. z.o.o.
Alior Bank
Bank Pekao

Management
List of CEOs:

PZU Group's operations 

 Non-life insurance
 Life insurance
Banking
Mutual funds
Pension funds
International operations
Medical services (Health)

Products and services 
The PZU Group offers insurance services in the areas of property, accident and life insurance. PZU also provides pension fund management, investment fund management, pension fund settlement services, national investment fund asset management, and insurance and financial brokerage services. The company is structured into two divisions: PZU and PZU Zycie. PZU in turn is divided into three segments: Corporate Insurance, Personal Insurance and Investment Activities. The segments Corporate Insurance and Private Customer Insurance are active in personal and property insurance. The Investing activities segment comprises investments with own funds. PZU Zycie deals with group insurance, individual continued insurance, individual life insurance, investment activities and investment contracts. PZU Zycie also provides other financial services such as investment and construction products through various distribution channels.

See also
List of Polish companies

References

External links 

 

Financial services companies established in 1803
Insurance companies of Poland
Politics of Poland
Privatization controversies
Privatization in Poland
Government-owned companies of Poland
Companies based in Warsaw
Companies listed on the Warsaw Stock Exchange
Polish brands
Insurance companies of Ukraine